"I Will Always Think About You" is a song by the American rock band New Colony Six, released in 1968 on their album Revelations and as a single. The song became a top 30 hit in the U.S., peaking at number 22 on the U.S. Billboard Hot 100 and Cash Box Top 100 Singles charts, and number 14 in Canada on the RPM Top Singles chart.

The song was a major hit in the Chicago market, where it reached number one on WLS-AM.

Chart performance

References

External links
 Lyrics of this song

1960s ballads
1968 songs
1968 singles
American pop songs
Mercury Records singles
Pop ballads